Francis Martin may refer to:
Francis Martin (priest) (1652–1722), Irish Augustinian
Francis W. Martin (1878–1947), American lawyer, first district attorney of the Bronx
Francis Xavier Martin (1922–2000), Irish cleric, historian and activist
Francis Martin (biblical scholar) (1930–2017), American priest
Francis Martin (athlete), American athlete
Francis Martin (musician) (1968–), Canadian musician and author

See also

Frank Martin (disambiguation)
François Martin (disambiguation)